Alexandre Agopoff (1918-2010), was a male French international table tennis player.

He won a bronze medal at the 1947 World Table Tennis Championships in the Swaythling Cup (men's team event). Three years later he won a second bronze at the 1950 World Table Tennis Championships in the Swaythling Cup.

Agopoff won eleven titles at national French championships, 1945 in singles, 1939, 1939, 1945 and 1947 in doubles and 1939, 1946, 1949-1951 and 1957 in mixed.

See also
 List of table tennis players
 List of World Table Tennis Championships medalists

References

French male table tennis players
1918 births
2010 deaths
World Table Tennis Championships medalists
Emigrants from the Ottoman Empire to France